Ann Marsh (born June 30, 1971) is an American fencer. She competed at the 1992, 1996 and 2000 Summer Olympics. She won a bronze medal in the team foil event at the 2001 World Fencing Championships.

She fenced for the Columbia Lions fencing team.  She graduated from Columbia University in 1994 and works as a physician in private practice.

References

External links
 

1971 births
Living people
American female foil fencers
Olympic fencers of the United States
Fencers at the 1992 Summer Olympics
Fencers at the 1996 Summer Olympics
Fencers at the 2000 Summer Olympics
Sportspeople from Royal Oak, Michigan
Pan American Games medalists in fencing
Pan American Games gold medalists for the United States
Pan American Games silver medalists for the United States
Fencers at the 1995 Pan American Games
Columbia Lions fencers
Medalists at the 1995 Pan American Games
21st-century American women